William Mackintosh, MacIntosh, McIntosh or M'Intosh may refer to:
Captain William Mackintosh, Irish-born British Army officer and Canadian engineer
W. A. Mackintosh William Archibald Mackintosh, (1895–1970), Canadian academic
William Mackintosh, Lord Kyllachy (1842–1918), Scottish advocate
Mackintosh of Borlum (1658–1743), Scottish soldier
William M'Intosh (1838–1931), also spelt McIntosh, Scottish physician and marine zoologist
William MacKintosh (fur trader) (1784-1842), worked for the Hudson's Bay Company, in Rupertland

See also
William McIntosh (disambiguation)